Papi Reddy (born 1 April 1976) is an Indian former cricketer. He played two first-class matches for Hyderabad in 1995/96.

See also
 List of Hyderabad cricketers

References

External links
 

1976 births
Living people
Indian cricketers
Hyderabad cricketers
People from Ranga Reddy district